Mark Ovenden F.R.G.S. (born 20 June 1963) is a broadcaster and author who specialises in the subjects of graphic design, cartography and architecture in public transport, with an emphasis on underground rapid transit.

His first book Metro Maps of the World published in 2003 is a guide to the diagrams, plans and maps of underground rapid transit system including images ranging from photos of the systems to rare and historical maps. The book was supported by the UITP, the international association of transport operators, and by the London Transport Museum. A Dutch edition was published in autumn 2006 (titled Metrokaarten van de wereld), and an American edition (entitled Transit Maps of the World) was launched on 30 October 2007 by Penguin Books. Other languages and revisions have followed.

Paris Metro Style in map and station design, was published November 2008. Endorsed by the RATP, it traces the cartographic evolution and graphic design of the Paris Metro. A revised American edition with a different title was published October 2009 and a French language edition was made in 2015.

Railway Maps of the World was published in May 2011 in the USA, a British edition was produced in September 2011. London Underground by Design was published by Penguin Books in January 2013. A celebration of the Johnston typeface centenary and 90th Anniversary of Gill Sans was published in 2016, and in July 2017 Ovenden fronted a television documentary for BBC Four on the subject of Johnston and Gill. and the skyscraper construction boom in Manchester for BBC Radio 4.

Ovenden was previously a journalist, news presenter and radio producer. He was founding editor of Due South Magazine and was half of the independent production company, 'OutSpoken', which made BBC Radio 1's 7-part lesbian and gay series Loud'n'proud in 1993. He also worked for: Kiss 102, as Programme Manager; Kiss 100, newsreader; BBC Radio Five, reporter; BBC Radio 1, producer of the Annie Nightingale show; Planet 24, researcher on GayTimeTV; BBC Two, contributor to Map Man; Ministry of Sound, Head of Radio; LBC, producer; and MTV, music programmer. At Atlantic 252 he was a producer and newsreader and co-presented a review show with Chris Coco. He also spent several years (1990–1993) working for Manchester City Council's Equality Group as a Gay Men's officer, charged with implementing their policy of non-discrimination and giving training sessions to staff countering homophobia, during the period when Section 28 was being enforced.

Works 
 Metro Maps of the World, Capital Transport, London, 2003. 
 Metrokaarten van de Wereld, Terra Lannoo, Arnhem, 2006. 
 Transit Maps of the World (Paperback), Penguin, New York, 2007. 
 Paris Metro Style in map and station design, Capital Transport, London, November 2008. 
 Paris Underground: The Maps, Stations, and Design of the Metro (Paperback), Penguin, New York, October 2009. 
 Railway Maps of the World, Viking Adult, New York, 2011. 
 Great Railway Maps of the World, Particular Books, London, 2011. 
 Vignelli Transit Maps Paperback (with Peter B. Lloyd), RIT Cary Press, Rochester, 2012. 
 London Underground by Design, Penguin Books, London, 2013. 
 Transit Maps of the World Expanded and Updated (Paperback), Penguin, New York, 2015.  
 Transit Maps of the World Expanded and Updated (Paperback), Particular Books, London, 2015. 
 Histoire Du Métro Parisien Racontée Par Ses Plans (l') (with Julian Pepinster) (Paperback), La Vie Du Rail, Paris, 2015. 
 世界の美しい地下鉄マップ (Paperback), Nikkei National Geographic, Tokyo, 2016. 
 Atlas de metros del mundo, CaptainSwing, Madrid, 2016.  
 Johnston & Gill: Very British Types, Lund Humphries, London, 2016, 
 Metrolink: The First 25 Years, Rails Publishing, London, 2017, 
 London Underground Architecture & Design Map, Blue Crow Media, London, 2017, 
 Airline Maps: A Century of Art and Design (with Maxwell Roberts), Penguin Random House, New York, 2019, 
 Paris Metro Architecture & Design Map, Blue Crow Media, London, 2019 
 Underground Cities: Mapping the tunnels, transits and networks of our cities, Frances Lincoln, London, 2020,

Notes

References 
 Underground Railways yesterday–today–tomorrow, Walter J Hinkel, Karl Treiber, Gerhard Valenta, Helmut Liebsch, Schmid Verlag, Vienna 2004
 Metro, the story of the underground railway, David Bennett, Mitchel Beazley, London 2004
 Telling the passenger where to get off, Andrew Dow, Capital Transport, London 2005
 Underground Maps after Beck, Maxwell J. Roberts, Capital Transport, London 2005
 The Subterranean Railway: How the London Underground was Built and how it Changed the City Forever, Christian Wolmar, Atlantic Books, London 2005
 Exchanges: A Global History Reader, Volume 2, From 1450 to the present, Trevor R. Getz, Richard J. Hoffman, Jarbel Rodriguez, Pearson Prentice Hall, Upper Saddle River, 2009
 Helvetica and the New York City Subway System, Paul Shaw, Blue Pencil Editions, New York 2010
 Le Métro de Paris, Julian Pepinster, Editions La vie du rail, Paris 2010 
 On The Map: Why the world looks the way it does,  Simon Garfield, Profile Books, London 2012
 Underground: How the Tube Shaped London,  David Bownes, Oliver Green and Sam Mullins, Allen Lane, London 2012 
 Mind the map, Zhan Guo, New York University, New York, 2010

External links 

 Personal website
 Metro maps of the world book website 
 Review in New York Times Sunday Book Review
 Review in LA Times
 Book review in The Guardian
 Author article on subject in The Times, London
 BBC News feature on Rail map book
 feature Wall Street Journal New York
 Library Thing
 BoingBoing review
 Interview on OutUK
 World urban rail poster
 Poster on Strangemaps
 Article on Beck and Paris

1963 births
Living people
English LGBT writers
English radio personalities
BBC people
Writers from London
Rail transport writers
British LGBT broadcasters